Nuss Lake is a small private  lake in Klamath Falls, Oregon, United States. The lake sits between the south skirt of Stukel Mountain and Olene Gap to the north.

Hydrology 
The Klamath area has a peculiar natural draining system. The larger portion of this area, including Poe, Langell and Yonna valleys, is drained by the Lost River and its tributaries, which flow into several small lakes before emptying into Tule Lake. Even though there are not many springs in Klamath County, some of the identifiable perennial springs that appear at land surface issue from the bottom of Nuss Lake. Hydraulic heads in wells are above surface at several places in the area, indicating that the aquifer is confined at these places, extending around Nuss Lake and the valley south and west of Stukel Mountain along Lost River. Many of these wells, including some north of Stukel Mountain have large flows. Two springs at Olene Gap are actually warm artesian springs whose waters are partly derived from the geothermal reservoir.

Irrigation 

Fishing 
The most common type of fish in the lake are largemouth bass, rainbow trout and bluegill.

Geography 
Approximately 66,500 people live in Klamath County, mainly in the Klamath Falls metropolitan area. Many small towns in South and Eastern Klamath Falls are centered on a rural agricultural base that takes advantage of the peculiar irrigation systems offered by the Upper Klamath Lake and Lost River. These communities are established upon seasonal industry, which feature large swings in labor force size, and in many cases, precipitate mass migrations of workers.

Within  of the shores of Nuss Lake, the locally called Poe Valley, are the cities of Bonanza, Merrill, Malin, Dorris and Tulelake, as well as the unincorporated communities of Altamont, Olene and Langell Valley.

See also
 Lake Ewauna
List of lakes in Oregon

References

External links

Klamath Falls, Oregon
Nuss
Lakes of Klamath County, Oregon